The eighth and final season of Dance Moms (an American dance reality-television series created by Collins Avenue) stars Abby Lee Miller after she completed her prison sentence and was diagnosed with non-Hodgkin's lymphoma in 2018. Miller rebuilds her dance company while battling after-effects of the cancer that has left her using a wheelchair.

Cast
This season was based at the Abby Lee Dance Company (ALDC) in Pittsburgh, Pennsylvania, and introduces a new cast of dancers and their moms, who appear throughout the season. This is also the final season to feature Lilliana Ketchman and Elliana Walmsley as part of the ALDC team.

Choreographers
 Abby Lee Miller
 Gianna Martello 
Laura Jarczewski

Dancers
 Elliana Walmsley (episodes 7-11)
 GiaNina Paolantonio
 Hannah Collin
 Lilliana Ketchman
 Sarah Georgiana
 Paris Moore (episodes 13-18)
 Pressley Hosbach
 Brady Farrar
 Savannah Kristich (episodes 1-6)

Moms 
 Yolanda Walmsley (episodes 7-11)
 Joanne Paolantonio
 Ann Collin
 Stacey Ketchman
 Michelle Georgiana
 Lakisha Samuels (episodes 13-17)
 Ashley Hosbach

 Erin Kristich (episodes 1-6)

Guests 
 Maesi Caes – former ALDC dancer; episode special "The New Team"
 Jaime Caes – former ALDC mom; episode special "The New Team"
 Kamryn Smith – guest ALDC dancer; episode 8
 Adriana Smith – guest ALDC mom; episode 8
 JoJo Siwa – former ALDC dancer; episode 9
 Jessalynn Siwa – former ALDC mom; episode 9
 Berkleigh Hernandez – guest ALDC dancer; episode 13
 Amanda Hernandez – guest ALDC mom; episode 13

Cast duration

Notes
 Key:  = featured in this episode
 Key:  = not featured in this episode
 Key:  = joins the Abby Lee Dance Company
 Key:  = returns to the Abby Lee Dance Company
 Key:  = leaves the Abby Lee Dance Company and the show entirely

Episodes

Production
The eighth season was announced in December 2018, when it was confirmed that Abby Lee Miller would return to the show. This season was originally titled Dance Moms: Resurrection, and set to premiere on June 4, 2019.

Season eight is produced by Jeff Collins ("The Drama Queen"); Bryan Stinson ("So Sharp"); Lindsay Weiglein; Tessa Khalaieff;  Michael Hammond ("Hell's Kitchen"); and Gena McCarthy, Brie Miranda Bryant and Kimberly Chessler (Lifetime).

References
   
General references 

 

2019 American television seasons